Standard frequency and time signal station  (also: standard frequency and time signal radio station) is – according to article 1.95 of the International Telecommunication Union´s (ITU) ITU Radio Regulations (RR) – defined as «A radio station in the standard frequency and time signal service.»

Each radio station shall be classified by the radiocommunication service in which it operates permanently or temporarily.

See also

References / sources 

 International Telecommunication Union (ITU)

Radio stations and systems ITU
Time signal radio stations